The Guamanian records in swimming are the fastest ever performances of swimmers from Guam, which are recognised and ratified by the Guam Swimming Federation.

All records were set in finals unless noted otherwise.

Long Course (50 m)

Men

Women

Mixed relay

Short Course (25 m)

Men

Women

Mixed relay

References

External links
 Guam Swimming Federation web site
 Guam Long Course Records

Guam
Records